Guess How Much I Love You (also known as Guess How Much I Love You: The Adventures of Little Nutbrown Hare) is a children's animated television series based on the book of the same name written by Sam McBratney. 

Season 1 was co-produced by SLR Productions and Scrawl Studios for KI.KA and Hessischer Rundfunk, in association with TVOKids, Knowledge Kids, YLE and SVTB and with the participation of TFO, HR1, ABC Television and The Walt Disney Company Australia, and distributed by CCI Entertainment until 9 Story Media Group acquired CCI's children's and family library in 2013.

Season 2 was instead a co-production with SLR Productions, 9 Story Media Group, KiKa and Hessischer Rundfunk, in association with HR1 and the Australian Broadcasting Corporation.

The show's genre is mostly fantasy, adventure, with some comedy, emotion, drama, and a little history in addition to the mostly humorous tone.

Characters
 Little Nutbrown Hare – Voiced by Ky Baldwin in the Australian dub, Matthew Jacob Wayne in the US dub.
 Big Nutbrown Hare – Voiced by Andrew McFarlane in Australian dub, Kirk Thornton in the US dub.
 Little Field Mouse – Voiced by Bella Soleil Mistry in Australian dub, Allie Carlton in the US dub.
 Otter – Voiced by Nicolas Roye in the US dub.
 Little Redwood Fox – Voiced by Monique Hore in Australian dub.
 Blue Bird – Voiced by Kate Flitzpatrick in Australian dub, Angelique Perrin in the US dub.
 Little Grey Squirrel – Voiced by Dylan Elchaar in Australian dub, Stuart Allan in the US dub.
 Little White Owl – Voiced by Monique Hore in the Australian dub, Micheala Dean in the US dub.

Episodes

Season 1 (2011-12)
 Treasure Hunt
 March Like an Ant
 Blue Wonder
 No Place Like Home
 Favourite Thing
 Big Like You
 What Sound Does the Moon Make?
 Autumn's Here
 Snow Blanket
 Snowflake
 Inside Day
 Slip Slop Slide
 Lucky Stick
 It's Okay
 Where's Little Redwood Fox?
 Hidden Treasures
 Moon Dance
 Winter Coat
 Winter Surprise
 New Friend
 Snow White Hare
 Field of Flowers
 Fly the Nest
 Blossoms
 The Scents of Spring
 Can You Touch the Stars?
 Follow Me
 The Nest
 Hide and Seek
 Feather Your Nest
 Fly Away Home
 Rainy Days
 A Hare's Tail
 Where Does the River Go?
 Leaf Shade
 Bedtime Story
 Hare's Eye View
 Taste of Sunset
 You for a Day
 Big Storm
 Plum Summer
 All Fall Down
 I Promise
 Pumpkin Patch
 Shadow Play
 Finders Keepers
 Surprise!
 The Big Apple
 Chestnut
 I Want to Fly
 Four Seasons
 Wind Whistle

Season 2 (2015-16)
 
 Little Green Worm
 Make a Rainbow
 The Favourite Tree
 Spider's Web
 Big Foot
 Too Big, Too Small
 Winter Moon
 Up All Night
 The Collection
 The Lucky Egg
 The Autumn Journey
 The Song of Spring
 Summer Strawberries
 The Slippery Slide
 Echo Game
 Cloudy Meadow
 Autumn Play
 Now You See Me
 Busy as a Bee
 Birthday Surprise
 Win or Lose
 Summer Days
 The Holly Branch
 Topsy-Flopsy Day
 Feast Day
 Where Are My Acorns?

Specials (2017)
 
 Christmas to the Moon and Back
 An Enchanting Easter

Broadcast
The series is shown on KiKa in Germany, TVOKids in Canada, ABC Kids in Australia, Disney Junior in the United States, Nickelodeon in France and the United Kingdom, and YLE in Finland.

Reception
The series was nominated for an AACTA Award for "Best Children's Television Series" in 2013.

References

2010s Australian animated television series
2011 Australian television series debuts
2017 Australian television series endings
2010s Canadian animated television series
2011 Canadian television series debuts
2017 Canadian television series endings
Australian children's animated television series
Australian flash animated television series
Australian preschool education television series
Australian television shows based on children's books
Canadian children's animated television series
Canadian flash animated television series
Canadian preschool education television series
Canadian television shows based on children's books
Animated television series about birds
Animated television series about mice and rats
Animated television series about rabbits and hares
Animated television series about squirrels
Animated preschool education television series
2010s preschool education television series
English-language television shows